The Two Towers is the second part of The Lord of the Rings by J. R. R. Tolkien.

The Two Towers may also refer to:
The Two Towers (MUD), a multi-user role-playing game established in 1994
The Lord of the Rings: The Two Towers, a 2002 film adaptation of the novel directed by Peter Jackson
The Lord of the Rings: The Two Towers (video game), a 2002 video game based on the film
The medieval Two Towers, Bologna, found in the Piazza di Porta Ravegnana, Bologna, Italy

See also
Twin Towers (disambiguation)